John Colin Ashworth (born 15 October 1949) is a New Zealand former rugby union player. A prop, Ashworth represented Canterbury and, briefly, Hawke's Bay at a provincial level, and was a member of the New Zealand national side, the All Blacks, from 1977 to 1985. He played 52 matches for the All Blacks including 24 internationals.

References

1949 births
Living people
People from Waikari
People educated at Riccarton High School
New Zealand rugby union players
New Zealand international rugby union players
Canterbury rugby union players
Hawke's Bay rugby union players
Rugby union props
Rugby union players from Canterbury, New Zealand